Toma Dam  is an earthfill dam located in Hokkaido Prefecture in Japan. The dam is used for irrigation. The catchment area of the dam is 19.8 km2. The dam impounds about 47  ha of land when full and can store 3039 thousand cubic meters of water. The construction of the dam was completed in 1967.

References

Dams in Hokkaido